James Blundell (27 December 1790, in Holborn, London – 15 January 1878, in St George Hanover Square, London) was an English obstetrician who performed the first successful transfusion of human blood to a patient for treatment of a haemorrhage.

Early years
James Blundell was born in London. His father's name was Major Blundell and mother was Sarah Ann Haighton. Major owned a company called Major Blundell and Co. Haberdashers, and Drapers in London.

Like his uncle, who had developed several instruments still used today for the delivery of babies, James specialized in the field of obstetrics. Later he graduated from the University of Edinburgh Medical School with his MD in 1813. A year later he began his career in London by lecturing on midwifery and physiology.
By 1818, he succeeded his uncle and became the lecturer on both subjects at Guy's Hospital where his classes on obstetrics and the diseases of women were reported to be the largest in London.

Blood transfusion work

In 1818, Blundell proposed that a blood transfusion would be appropriate to treat severe postpartum hemorrhage. He had seen many of his patients dying in childbirth, and determined to develop a remedy. However, he was also familiar with the work of Leacock in Edinburgh, who said that the transfer of blood from one species would be harmful to another. Therefore, Blundell conducted a series of experiments using animals, and observed that as long as the blood was transfused quickly, a transfusion would be successful with a syringe even after it had been collected in a container. He also discovered the importance of letting all the air out of a syringe prior to the transfusion.

Blundell performed the first successful human to human transfusion in 1818. In 1829, he reported this transfusion in an article in the medical journal Lancet. Dr. Blundell extracted four ounces of blood from the arm of the patient's husband using a syringe, and successfully transfused it into the patient. Over the course of five years, he conducted ten documented blood transfusions, five of which were beneficial to the patients, and published these results. During his life he also devised many instruments for the transfusion of blood, many of which are still in use today.

He became the author of Researches Physiological and Pathological in 1824 and wrote two papers on abdominal surgery and blood transfusion, both edited by S. Ashwell. Later publications include Principles and Practice of Obstetricy in 1834 and Observations on some of the More Important Diseases of Women in 1837. In using the uterine sound for diagnostic purposes, he was considered more advanced than other obstetricians of the day.

Later life
He left Guy's in 1834 following a dispute with the hospital treasurer. He became a fellow of the Royal College of Physicians in 1838, and later published Hexametrical Experiments, or, A version of four of Virgil's pastorals... with hints to explain the method of reading, and a slight essay on the laws of metre that year.

Dr. Blundell never married, but lived with his grand niece Mary Ann Harriet Noyes. From the 1871 British Census, we know he was living at 80 Piccadilly in London, but he also had a home in Westminster at No. 1 Great George Street.

Dr. Blundell retired from practice in 1847. In his final years, it is said that he never rose before noon, saw patients in the afternoon, dined and then saw more patients after 8 or 9 pm. He always carried books with him, and was able to read them in his carriage by the installation of a special light.

Death
James Blundell died on 15 January 1878 in London, aged 87. His will, dated 11 April 1857 with a codicil of 27 March 1876, was proven on 29 January by his nephew Dr. George Augustus Frederick Wilks. His estate was valued at £350,000 at the time, today equivalent of over £45,000,000. The fortune had been amassed by his large private practice and significant bequests. Much of it was left to his niece Sarah Haighton Noyes (née Wilks) whose husband Henry Crine Noyes had died five years earlier.

References

Attribution

Sources
[Anon.]. "Blundell, James (1790–1878)." Rev. Anne Digby. In Oxford Dictionary of National Biography, edited by H. C. G. Matthew and Brian Harrison. Oxford: OUP, 2004. http://www.oxforddnb.com/view/article/2713 (accessed 11 December 2008).
Personal Papers of the Noyes Family, in the possession of Cameron Bryant.

1790 births
1878 deaths
People from Holborn
Alumni of the University of Edinburgh
19th-century English medical doctors
English obstetricians